The 2015–16 Arkansas Razorbacks men's basketball team represented the University of Arkansas in the 2015–16 season. The team's head coach was Mike Anderson, who was in his fifth season. The team played their home games at Bud Walton Arena in Fayetteville, Arkansas, as a member of the SEC. They finished the season 16–16, 9–9 in SEC play to finish in a tie for eighth place. They lost in the second round of the SEC tournament to Florida.

Previous season
The Razorbacks achieved a 27–9 record during the 2014–15 season, where they finished runner-up to Kentucky both in the league and in the SEC tournament.

Arkansas earned its first NCAA tournament berth since 2008, defeating Wofford before falling to North Carolina in the round of 32.

Departures

Incoming Transfers

Incoming class

Recruiting class of 2016

Recruiting class of 2017

Roster

Schedule and results

|-
!colspan=12 style="background:#; color:#FFFFFF;"| Non-conference exhibition

|-
!colspan=12 style="background:#; color:#FFFFFF;"| Regular season

|-
!colspan=12 style="background:#;"| SEC Tournament

Source: 2015–16 Schedule

References

Arkansas Razorbacks men's basketball seasons
Arkansas
Razor
Razor